Helber Rangel (1944–2002) was a Brazilian film actor. He debuted in Carlos Diegues' 1973 film Joanna Francesa. In 1979, he won the Gramado Film Festival Best Actor Award for his performance on Ipojuca Pontes's A Volta do Filho Pródigo.

Selected filmography
 Joanna Francesa (1973)
 Os Condenados (1973)
 Perdida (1976)
 Embalos Alucinantes (1978)
 Memórias do Medo (1979)
 Cabaret Mineiro (1980)
 Luz del Fuego (1982)
 Quincas Borba (1987)

References

External links

Biography of Helber Rangel 

1944 births
2002 deaths
Brazilian male film actors
Male actors from Rio de Janeiro (city)